Pseuduvarus is a genus of beetles in the family Dytiscidae, containing the following species:

 Pseuduvarus secundus Bilardo & Rocchi, 2002
 Pseuduvarus vitticollis (Boheman, 1848)

References

Dytiscidae